True Story may refer to:

Film and television 

 True Story (film), a 2015 film
 True Story (miniseries), a 2021 limited American television series
 True Story with Hamish & Andy, a 2017-2018 Australian television series
 True Story with Ed and Randall, a 2022 American adaptation; see List of Peacock original programming
 The True Story, documentary series

Music 

 True Story (The B.G.'z album), 1995
 True Story (Terror Squad album), 2004
 True Story (Timaya album), 2007

Writing 
 True Story (magazine), an American magazine founded in 1919
 True Story, 2011 mixtape by Future
 A True Story, a satirical novel by Lucian of Samosata that is sometimes considered the oldest work of science fiction
 True Story: A Novel, a 1994 book by Bill Maher

See also
 Nonfiction
 True Stories (disambiguation)
 Based on a True Story (disambiguation)